Ken Martin (born September 10, 1958) is a former American long-distance runner who is a two-time United States national champion in the marathon. At the 1984 California International Marathon, Martin set a course record with a time of 2:11:24. At the 1985 Pittsburgh Marathon, he competed alongside his wife at the time, Lisa Martin; they became the fastest married couple ever in a marathon and won both of their divisions. He came second in the 1989 New York City Marathon in 2:09:38 to Tanzania’s Juma Ikangaa’s 2:08:01; as of 2007, that was the fourth-fastest marathon time by an American-born athlete.

Achievements
All results regarding marathon, unless stated otherwise

References 

1958 births
Living people
American male long-distance runners
20th-century American people